The Taman Daya Hockey Stadium or Johor State Hockey Stadium is the hockey stadium in Taman Daya, Tebrau, Johor Bahru District, Johor, Malaysia.

Events
 2009 Men's Hockey Junior World Cup
 Sultan of Johor Cup

See also
 Sport in Malaysia

References

Buildings and structures in Johor Bahru
Field hockey venues in Malaysia
Sports venues in Johor